The magua (Manchu:  olbo) was a style of jacket worn by males during the Qing dynasty (1644–1911), designed to be worn together with and over the manshi changshan as part of the Qizhuang. Magua is at waist length, with five disc buttons on the front and slightly short, wide sleeves. The garment was available in a number of styles: singlet, clip, leather, cotton yarn, quilted and others. It was worn by Manchu people throughout China from the reign of the Qing Shunzhi Emperor (r. 1643–1661) until the time of the Kangxi Emperor, (r. 1661–1722), whence it became popular throughout Qing China.

Rendered literally in English as "riding jacket", the magua had its origins as a simple tabard-like item of clothing intended to protect the changshan during riding and normal everyday activities. However, with time the magua itself became more elaborate, becoming for officials part of their uniform of office; one variation of the magua, the imperial yellow jacket, becoming an indication of Imperial approval of an individual.

The magua is considered the predecessor of the balsam jacket (fèngxiān zhuāng) and the tangzhuang.

In Chinese culture

Tujia minority 
Tujia is one of the 56 recognized ethnic groups in China. Both men and women mainly wear skirts and jackets, favoring colors such as black and blue. After the 1730s, men and women started to wear clothes that would help differentiate their gender. The magua, buttoned at the center front, is worn by men over the blue long robe. It can be worn formally in black or informally in colors of red, green or gray, with wide trousers usually in a different color, often white. Men would tie sashes around their waist band to help them carry tools or accessories and wear white or black turbans. Women, on the other hand, wore wide short sleeved, long gowns that button on the left side, with decorative elements at the edge of the sleeves and the collar, accompanied with a bafu luoqun (or skirt of eight widths) made of red and black checked silk, embroidered with flowers or other designs.

Magua is also associated with social status, as men tried to incorporate the dress etiquettes from the Han period. The magua is accompanied by fur coats, silk gowns and skull caps. By the early 1950s, the popularity of the style decreased.

Types of Magua 
 Huang magua (yellow magua)

Regional variations

Burmese taikpon

The taikpon eingyi, a traditional jacket for Burmese men, is a descendant of the magua. This costume began to gain currency during the late Konbaung dynasty and became a requisite article of traditional formal attire during the colonial era.

Korean magoja 

The magoja, a type of long jacket worn with hanbok, the traditional clothing of Korea, is a descendant of the magua, having been introduced to Koreans after Heungseon Daewongun, father of King Gojong, returned from political exile in Manchuria in 1887.

See also
Qizhuang - Manchu clothing
Burmese clothing
Cheongsam
Chinese clothing
Tangzhuang

References

Jackets
Qing clothing
Burmese clothing
17th-century fashion
18th-century fashion
19th-century fashion
20th-century fashion
21st-century fashion